The Embassy of the United Arab Emirates, Islamabad is a diplomatic mission of the United Arab Emirates in Islamabad, Pakistan. It is located inside the Diplomatic Enclave in Islamabad. The present UAE ambassador to Pakistan is H.E. Hamad Obaid Ibrahim Al-Zaabi. The UAE also has a Consulate-General in Karachi.

See also

 Pakistan–United Arab Emirates relations
 List of diplomatic missions of the United Arab Emirates
 List of diplomatic missions in Pakistan

References

External links
 Embassy of the United Arab Emirates, Islamabad

Islamabad
United Arab Emirates
Pakistan–United Arab Emirates relations
United Arab Emirates